The 1824 United States presidential election in Vermont took place between October 26 and December 2, 1824, as part of the 1824 United States presidential election. The state legislature chose seven representatives, or electors (the last time they would do this in Vermont) to the Electoral College, who voted for President and Vice President.

During this election, the Democratic-Republican Party was the only major national party, and four different candidates from this party sought the Presidency. Vermont cast seven electoral votes for New England native John Quincy Adams.

Results

See also
 United States presidential elections in Vermont

References

Vermont
1824
1824 Vermont elections